"Devil Eyes" is a song by Penny McLean released as fourth single from her album Lady Bump in 1976. The song managed to appear in 2 charts worldwide. Justin Kantor from the website "AllMusic" cited "Devil Eyes" as one of the few enjoyable moments to be found in the Lady Bump album.

Charts

References

1976 singles
Penny McLean songs
Disco songs
1976 songs
Songs with lyrics by Michael Kunze
Songs with music by Sylvester Levay